Kanetisa is a monotypic butterfly genus from the subfamily Satyrinae in the family Nymphalidae. Its single species, Kanetisa digna, lives in India. Members have large bands across their wings.

References

Satyrini
Monotypic butterfly genera
Butterflies described in 1883
Taxa named by Frederic Moore